Joshua Close (born 31 August 1981 in Oakville, Ontario) is a Canadian film and television actor.

Filmography

External links

1981 births
Living people
Canadian male film actors
Canadian male television actors
People from Oakville, Ontario
Male actors from Ontario
21st-century Canadian male actors
Best Supporting Actor in a Television Film or Miniseries Canadian Screen Award winners